Weston Observatory may refer to a location in the United States:

 Weston Observatory (Boston College), a research institute at Boston College
 Weston Observatory (Manchester, New Hampshire), listed on the National Register of Historic Places